NGC 4488 is a lenticular galaxy located about 60 million light-years away in the constellation of Virgo. The galaxy was discovered by astronomer William Herschel on December 28, 1785. NGC 4488 is a member of the Virgo Cluster.

Structure
NGC 4488 has an unusual rectangular shaped structure similar to the galaxy LEDA 74886. The galaxy does not have an inner disk. It also has two arms coming off diagonally opposite sides suggesting that NGC 4488 has had a gravitational interaction with another galaxy.

See also 
 List of NGC objects (4001–5000)
 LEDA 74886
 Peculiar galaxy

References

External links 

Lenticular galaxies
Virgo (constellation)
4488
Virgo Cluster
41363
7653
Astronomical objects discovered in 1785
Peculiar galaxies